Manduca is a surname. Notable people with the surname include:

Gustavo Manduca (born 1980), Brazilian footballer and manager
Jorge Manduca (born 1979), Argentine footballer
Julian Manduca (1958–2005), Maltese environmentalist
Paul Manduca (born 1951), British businessman